The following lists events that happened during 1989 in South Africa.

Incumbents
 State President:
 P.W. Botha (until 15 August).
 F.W. de Klerk (acting from 15 August, incumbent from 20 September).
 Chief Justice: Pieter Jacobus Rabie.

Events

January
 8 – The African National Congress announces that it will start dismantling its guerrilla camps in Angola in support of the peace process.
 18 – State President P.W. Botha has a mild stroke.
 19 – Chris Heunis, Minister of Constitutional Development and Planning, is appointed Acting State President.
 An Eskom sub-station in Glenwood, Durban is damaged by an explosion and police later defuses a second bomb found nearby.
 An explosion occurs at the home in Benoni of the chair of the Ministers Council in the House of Delegates.
 An explosion occurs at an aircraft factory in Ciskei.
 Two municipal police members are killed in a grenade attack on Katlehong's Municipal Police Station.

February
 2 – An ailing State President Pieter Willem Botha steps down from the leadership of the National Party, but remains state president.
 Trevor Manuel is released from detention under stringent restriction orders.
 An explosion at a municipal police barracks in Soweto injures four policemen.
 An explosion next to a police parade in Katlehong kills a municipal constable and injures nine others.
 A limpet mine explodes at the home of the commander of the Katlehong Police Station, Col. D. Dlamini.

March
 15–21 – A conference of African National Congress chief representatives and regional treasurers takes place in Gran, Norway.
 An explosion occurs outside the Natal Command HQ on Durban's beachfront.

April
 2 – SWAPO violates the border war cease-fire by invading South West Africa from Angola and nearly 300 are killed.

May
 5 – Three South African Embassy staff are ordered to leave Britain within 7 days because of the attempted smuggling of a Blowpipe missile.
 The South African Air Force's Klippan Radar Station in the Western Transvaal comes under mortar attack.

June
 Four bystanders are injured when a limpet mine explodes under a police vehicle in Duduza.
 A limpet mine explodes under a vehicle parked outside a policeman's home in Tsakane.
 A grenade is thrown at a police patrol in Tsakane.
 A limpet mine explodes in a rubbish bin outside the home of a policeman in Soweto.
 A bomb shatters the windows of KwaThema Police station's dining hall.
 A limpet mine explodes at the Police single quarters in Ratanda.
 A limpet mine explodes at the home of Boetie Abramjee, a National Party MP.

July
 5 – State President P.W. Botha and Nelson Mandela, in prison at the time, meet for the first time.
 23 – An explosive device planted at Athlone Magistrate's Court and police complex detonates prematurely, killing two African National Congress members.

August
 15 – P.W. Botha resigns and F.W. de Klerk succeeds him as acting State President.
 A grenade is thrown into a Labour Party polling station in Bishop Lavis.
 The Brixton Flying Squad HQ is attacked with hand grenades and AK-47s.
 Lt-Col. Frank Zwane, a former liaison officer for the police, and his two sons are injured in a grenade attack in Soweto.
 An explosion occurs at the Athlone Police Station.

September
 2 – "Purple Rain Protest" rioters in Greenmarket Square, Cape Town are sprayed with a purple dye. The resulting graffiti, "The purple shall govern" graces the pages of newspapers worldwide.
 20 – F.W. de Klerk becomes the 9th State President of South Africa.
 A police patrol is ambushed by cadres (terrorists) in Katlehong.
 A mini-limpet mine explodes outside the Mamelodi Police station.
 Parliamentary elections are held and the National Party wins again.
 100,000 people attend a peace march called by Cape Town city mayor Gordon Oliver in conjunction with religious leaders.

October
 15 – Ahmed Kathrada, Jafta Masemola, Raymond Mhlaba, Wilton Mkwayi, Andrew Mlangeni, Elias Motsoaledi, Oscar Mpetha and Walter Sisulu were released from custody of Apartheid government after some spending more than two decades in prison of Robben Island and other prisons.
 A bomb explodes outside the BP centre in Cape Town and another at Woodstock minutes later.

November
 27 – The Hex River Tunnels system is officially opened.

Unknown date
 The Hluhluwe and Umfolozi Game Reserves are joined through the Corridor Reserve as the Hluhluwe-Umfolozi Game Reserve.
 The government starts dismantling its six nuclear fission devices.

Births
 15 January – Akhumzi Jezile, actor, television presenter and producer (d. 2018)
 15 January – Kylie Louw, footballer
 21 January – Brady Barends, cricketer
 4 February – Nkosi Johnson, HIV/AIDS (d. 2001)
 10 February – Simon Harmer, cricketer
 22 February – JJ Engelbrecht, rugby player
 24 February – Lauren Brant; Australian entertainer
 9 March – Carina Horn, sprinter
 9 March – Luthando Shosha, tv presenter & radio personality
 22 March – Coenie Oosthuizen, rugby player
 24 March – Jennifer Fry, badminton player
 4 April – Dane Paterson, cricketer
 13 April – Gerhard van den Heever, rugby union player
 28 April – Alistair Vermaak, rugby union player
 4 May – Trevor Nyakane, rugby player
 11 May – Ashleigh Buhai, golfer
 14 May – Melinda Bam, beauty pageant contestant and model
 2 June – Dean Burmester, golfer
 10 June – David Miller, cricketer
 18 July – Mandla Masango, football player
 25 July – Victor Hogan, discus thrower
 26 July – Ross Cronjé, rugby union player
 30 July – Wayne Parnell, cricketer
 2 August – Vanes-Mari Du Toit, netball player
 2 August – Rudy Paige, rugby player
 3 August – Themba Zwane, football player
 5 August – Darren Keet, footballer
 9 August – Lunga Shabalala, actor & tv personality.
 18 August – Willie le Roux, rugby player
 13 September – Jurgen Visser, rugby union player
 4 October – Madoda Yako, rugby union player
 9 October – Rilee Rossouw, cricketer
 25 October – Lejeanne Marais, figure skater
 27 October Ntsako khoza, Tax payer
 6 November – Cherise Taylor, road cyclist
 18 December – Thulani Hlatshwayo, South africa national football team captain
 25 December – Pat O'Brien, rugby union player
 29 December – Sibusiso Vilakazi, football player

Deaths
 1 May – David Webster, academic and activist. (b. 1944)
 22 May – Steven De Groote, classical pianist. (b. 1953)
 12 September – Anton Lubowski, advocate and secretary-general of SWAPO. (b. 1952)

Railways

Locomotives
 A Class  2-6-2+2-6-2 Garratt articulated steam locomotive is rebuilt to Class NG G16A by the Alfred County Railway.
 The South African Railways places the first of twenty-five Class 10E2 electric locomotives with a Co-Co wheel arrangement in mainline service.

Sports

Athletics
 25 February – Willie Mtolo wins his second national title in the men's marathon, clocking 2:13:13 in Port Elizabeth.

References

South Africa
Years in South Africa
History of South Africa